The Newlyn Football Netball Club is an Australian rules football and netball club from Newlyn, Victoria which competes in the Central Highlands Football League. The Cats are one of the founding members of the CHFL.

History
Established in 1900, Newlyn Football Club commenced organised competition the following year in the Creswick District Football Association. Prior to 1932 there were 14 different competitions mainly covering the district around Creswick., winning a total of five premierships, before helping establish the Clunes Football Association in 1931.

Newlyn was a strong combination, Between 1932 and 1938 the team contested six out of seven grand finals, winning in 1932, 1935, 1936 and 1938. Disrupted by WW2 the club claimed a fifth flag in 1949, it took another thirteen years before the club defeated Creswick to win the 1962 flag.

McKay would play in 263 games and be in four premierships sides.

Locally that year the club won the flag against Springbank by five points. They went back to back the next year with a 61-point win against Bungaree and finally in 1975 they defeated Bungaree again be 1975 by 67 points.

In Clunes Football League last season in 1978, it was one of the most climatic in its history as Newlyn and Clunes played out the competition's only ever grand final draw with Clunes 9.15.69 to Newlyn 10.9.69. Clunes won the replay 20.5.125 to Newlyn  7.11.53.

Two Premierships have been won in the Central Highlands Football League, in 1992 against Dunnstown and then eleven years later in 2003 against Buninyong.

Premierships

 Donated Thorphies
 1903, 1906, 1907
 Creswick District Football Association
 1920, 1927, 1928, 
 Clunes Football League
 1932, 1935, 1936, 1938, 1949, 1962, 1969, 1970, 1975, 
 Central Highlands Football League
 1992, 2003

VFL/AFL players
 David McKay - 
 Brad Sewell -

Bibliography
 History of Football in the Ballarat District by John Stoward –

References

External links
 

Australian rules football clubs in Victoria (Australia)
Netball teams in Victoria (Australia)
1900 establishments in Australia
Australian rules football clubs established in 1900